Austrophya is a genus of dragonflies in the family Austrocorduliidae, endemic to north-eastern Australia.

Species
This genus includes the following species:
 Austrophya mystica  - rainforest mystic
 Austrophya monteithorum  - summit mystic

From 1909 Austrophya used to be a monotypic genus with only one species, Austrophya mystica, until Austrophya monteithorum was described in 2019.

Etymology
The genus name Austrophya, is derived from two words: the prefix Austro-, from a Latin word Australis, meaning southern, could be for purely Australian genera; the suffix -phya, derived from a Greek word meaning stature or growth, refers to existing generic names of dragonflies Neophya and Cordulephya, which are allied to this genus.

Taxonomy
There are differing views as to the family that Austrophya best belongs to:
 It is considered to be part of the Austrocorduliidae family at the Australian Faunal Directory
 It is considered to be part of the Synthemistidae family in the World Odonata List at the Slater Museum of Natural History
 It is considered to be part of the Corduliidae family at Wikispecies

References

Austrocorduliidae
Odonata of Australia
Anisoptera genera
Endemic fauna of Australia
Taxa named by Robert John Tillyard
Insects described in 1909
Fauna of Queensland